Tarasadi is city and a Municipality  in Surat district in the Indian state of Gujarat.  The town is located 45 km North-East of Surat on Surat-Mumbai highway near Kosamba.

Geography 
The city is located at an average elevation of 12 metres (66 feet).

Demographics 
 India census, Tarasadi had a population of 19567. Males constitute 51% of the population and females 49%. Tarsadi has an average literacy rate of 74%, higher than the national average of 59.5%: male literacy is 81%, and female literacy is 63%. In Tarsadi, 14% of the population is under 6 years of age.

Transport 
By road: Tarsadi is 2 km from Kosamba and 45 km from Surat.

By air: Nearest airport is Surat which is 59 km from Tarsadi.

By Trains: Tarsadi is 2 km from kosamba railway station

Geography 

BY ROAD-TARSADI is located Approx 45 km from SURAT CITY and 35 km from BHARUCH CITY. From NH 8. Kosmaba is about 4 km inside.

BY Train-As TARSADI(KOSAMBA) station is a junction have good Stoppages of Local as well as Express Trains like jamnagar intercity which stops to kosamba after starting from surat. Now computer reservation system is also started on kosamba station so the people gets facility
Kosamba is located at  It has an average elevation of 13 metres (42 feet).

See also 
List of tourist attractions in Surat

References 

Suburban area of Surat
Cities and towns in Surat district